These are the largest glaciers on mainland Norway. However, the 18 largest glaciers in the Kingdom of Norway are on Svalbard, including the second largest glacier in Europe, Austfonna on Nordaustlandet. In total, Norway has around 1,600 glaciers - 900 of these are in North Norway, but 60% of the total glacier area is south of Trøndelag. 1% of mainland Norway is covered by glaciers.

List

See also 
 List of Norwegian fjords
 List of glaciers

References 

Glaciers
Norway